Hurius is a genus of the spider family Salticidae (jumping spiders) from South America.

Species
, the World Spider Catalog accepted the following species:
 Hurius aeneus (Mello-Leitão, 1941) – Argentina
 Hurius petrohue Galiano, 1985 – Chile
 Hurius pisac Galiano, 1985 – Peru
 Hurius vulpinus Simon, 1901 – Ecuador

References

Salticidae
Spiders of South America
Salticidae genera